Blackwater Community School (BCS) is a co-educational, multi-denominational community school in Lismore, County Waterford, Ireland. The school offers Junior Certificate and Leaving Certificate programmes. It's the one hundred and forty sixth Public School in the county and according to official data on fourth position in the county arranged by number of pupils. In 2020 BCS was ranked 367th in The Sunday Times 'Best Schools Guide Top 400'.

History
Blackwater Community School is an amalgamation of three local schools: Lismore CBS, Presentation Convent, Lismore and St Anne’s Secondary School, Cappoquin. It was opened in September 2003 with a student population of 400 students.

References

External links
 

Secondary schools in County Waterford
2003 establishments in Ireland